Jerrel Feller (born June 9, 1987 in Heemskerk) is a Dutch athlete who specialises in the  100 meter relay. Feller competed at the 2011 World Athletics Championships. For the 2012 Summer Olympics he was reserve in the 4x 100 meter relay but did not compete.

References

External links
 sports reference for 2011 World Athletics Championships

Dutch male sprinters
People from Heemskerk
1987 births
Living people
Sportspeople from North Holland
21st-century Dutch people